Chillakur is a village and partly out growth of Gudur in Tirupati district of the Indian state of Andhra Pradesh. It is located in Gudur revenue division.

Geography
It has an average elevation of 14 meters (49 feet).

References 

Villages in Nellore district